Khuri is a rural locality (a selo) and the administrative centre of Khurinsky Selsoviet, Laksky District, Republic of Dagestan, Russia. The population was 518 as of 2010. There are 3 streets.

Geography 
Khuri is located 141 km southwest of Makhachkala, 2 km northeast of Kumukh (the district's administrative centre) by road, on the right bank of the Kazikumukhskoye Koysu River. Kumukh and Khurukra are the nearest rural localities.

Nationalities 
Laks live there.

Famous residents 
 Mikail Kalilov (general)
 Khayrutdin Gadzhiyev (cardiologist, doctor of medical sciences, professor, author and co-author of about 200 scientific works)
 Gabib Tsakhayev (physiologist, doctor of natural sciences, doctor of biological sciences, member of the International Academy of Cosmononautics, professor of the Lithuanian Academy of Sciences)
 Nabi Tsakhayev (doctor of medical Sciences, professor)
 Zaidat Musayeva (neurologist, doctor of medical sciences, professor)

Sights 
 Kumukh fortress
 Mosque-museum built in 1572.
 Cannons of the tsarist army of the 18th century.
 Mausoleum "Musa katta".
 Vacilou mount

References 

Rural localities in Laksky District